Niazi Niazai, Nyazi, Nyazai, Niyazi or Niyazai is one of the largest Pashtun tribes  which resides in Afghanistan and northwestern part of Pakistan.

The earliest work which provides the details about origin of Niazis is Makhzani-i-Afghani (1610 AD), written by Naimatullah under the patronage of Khan Jahan Lodi, an Afghan noble of Mughal emperor Jahangir. Makhzan-i Afghani gives the genealogy of Niazi tribe as:

Notable people with this surname
 Imran Khan Niazi: Former Pakistani cricketer turned politician, former Prime Minister of Pakistan.
 Isa Khan Niazi: Afghan nobleman. His descendants are still living in Qila Niazi, Paktia Province, Afghanistan, and in Mianwali, Pakistan.
 Haibat Khan Niazi: Senior military commander of Sher Shah Suri, brother of Isa Khan Niazi.
 Abdul Sattar Khan Niazi: Pakistani politician and religious figure.
 Muhammad Ayaz Niazi: Afghan Islamic scholar, khatib and imam. 
 Amir Abdullah Khan Rokhri: Pakistani politician and activist.
 Amir Abdullah Khan Niazi: Pakistani Army lieutenant general, surrendered at Dhaka in 1971.
 Karamat Rahman Niazi: Four-star admiral in Pakistan Navy.
 Muhammad Amjad Khan Niazi: Four-star admiral in Pakistan Navy, current Chief of Naval Staff.
 Munir Niazi: Pakistani poet.
 Gholam Mohammad Niazi: Afghan politician and religious figure.
 Sher Afgan Niazi: Pakistani politician (MNA) during Benazir and Musharaf eras.
 Attaullah Khan Esakhelvi, Pakistani folk singer and politician.
 Gul Hameed Khan Rokhri, Pakistani politician.
 Imran Ahsan Khan Nyazee, Pakistani Islamic Law Scholar and Author.
 Saifullah Niazi, Pakistani politician.
 Humair Hayat Khan Rokhri, Pakistani politician, son of Gul Hameed Khan Rokhri.
 Misbah-ul-Haq Khan Niazi: Pakistani cricketer.
 Ghulam Hazrat Niazi: Afghan footballer who plays for Ordu Kabul F.C. and the Afghanistan national football team.
 Fazal Niyazai: Afghan cricketer.
 Saifora Niazi: Member of Parliament of Afghanistan.
 Shadab Khan: Pakistani cricketer.
 Ghulam Akbar Khan Niazi: Pakistani born Saudi Arabian physician.
 Kausar Niazi: Pakistani politician and religious leader.

See also
Bettani
Lohani
Qila Niazi
Mianwali District

References

Further reading
Qila Niazi

Advanced History of Medieval India
A History of Pakistan and Its Origins

Surnames
Ethnic groups in Afghanistan
Ethnic groups in Pakistan
Social groups of Pakistan
Pakistani names
Bettani Pashtun tribes
Turkish-language surnames
Pashto-language surnames
Turkish masculine given names